Fred Perkins (July 8, 1938-) is an architect based in Little Rock, Arkansas.  He has designed about 200 churches.

He is managing partner of Roark Perkins Perry Yelvington Architects

Works include:
Morris House, Lonoke, Arkansas, Mid-century modern in style.

References

Architects from Arkansas
20th-century American architects
21st-century American architects
1938 births
Living people